The 198th Pennsylvania House of Representatives District is located in Philadelphia County and includes the following areas:

 Ward 11 [PART, Divisions 04, 05, 06, 09, 10, 12, 14, 15, 16, 17 and 18]
 Ward 12
 Ward 13
 Ward 17 [PART, Divisions 16, 21, 22, 23, 24, 25 and 29]
 Ward 38 [PART, Divisions 02, 03, 04, 05, 06, 10, 11, 17, 18 and 21]

Representatives

References

Government of Philadelphia
198